Alfred Huber (29 January 1910 – 25 January 1986) was a German international footballer.

References

1910 births
1986 deaths
Association football forwards
German footballers
Germany international footballers